Walter Pauk was Cornell University's reading and study center director. He was the author of the best-selling How To Study In College. Pauk has been lauded as "one of the most influential professors in the field of developmental education and study skills". He created Cornell Notes.

In 1997, Pauk was recognized for his work with the Pearl Anniversary Award by The College Reading and Learning Association.

Pauk died on December 7, 2019.

Select bibliography

References

Cornell University faculty
American education writers
2019 deaths
American centenarians
Men centenarians